54 Eridani is a suspected astrometric binary star system located around 400 light years from the Sun in the equatorial constellation of Eridanus. It is visible to the naked eye as a faint, reddish hued star with a baseline apparent visual magnitude of 4.32. The object is moving closer to the Earth with a heliocentric radial velocity of −33 km/s.

The visible component is an aging red giant star, currently on the asymptotic giant branch, with a stellar classification of M3/4 III. It is a semiregular variable star of subtype SRb, ranging in magnitude from 4.28 down to 4.36. The star has pulsation periods of 18.8 and 45.5 days, each with an amplitude of 0.019 in magnitude. With the hydrogen at its core exhausted, the star has expanded to around 69 times the Sun's radius and it is radiating 1,021 times the luminosity of the Sun from its swollen photosphere at an effective temperature of 3,915 K.

References 

M-type giants
Asymptotic-giant-branch stars
Astrometric binaries
Eridanus (constellation)
Durchmusterung objects
Eridani, 54
029755
021763
1496
Semiregular variable stars
Eridani, DM